Salaspils Station is a railway station on the Riga – Daugavpils Railway. It is situated 18.3 km from Riga and 198.7 km from Daugavpils

References 

Railway stations in Latvia
Railway stations opened in 1861